Karel D'Haene  (born September 5, 1980) is a Belgian retired professional football player who last played for S.V. Zulte Waregem as a defender. He helped Trabzonspor win the 2003–04 Turkish Cup.

References

External links
Profile at Footballdatabase.eu
 Profile at VI.nl 

1980 births
Sportspeople from Kortrijk
Footballers from West Flanders
Living people
Belgian footballers
Association football defenders
Belgian expatriate footballers
K.S.V. Waregem players
Royal Antwerp F.C. players
Trabzonspor footballers
Manisaspor footballers
S.V. Zulte Waregem players
Belgian Pro League players
Süper Lig players
Expatriate footballers in Turkey